Ghrelin O-acyltransferase also known as membrane bound O-acyltransferase domain containing 4 is an enzyme that in humans is encoded by the MBOAT4 gene.
It is homologous to other membrane-bound O-acyltransferases. It is a polytopic membrane protein what takes part in lipid signaling reactions. It is the only known enzyme that catalyzes the acylation of ghrelin through the transfer of n-octanoic acid to ghrelin Ser3. Ghrelin O-acyltransferase function is essential in regulation of appetite and the release of growth hormone. Ghrelin O-acyltransferase is a target for scientific research due to promising applications in the treatment of diabetes, eating disorders, and metabolic diseases.

Consistent with its function relative to ghrelin, ghrelin O-acyltransferase can be found in all vertebrates, including mammals, birds, and fish species. The enzyme is primarily expressed in the stomach and the gastrointestinal system. Other sites where ghrelin O-acyltransferase can be found include tissue from the brain, the pancreas, the pituitary gland, and certain forms of cancer.

Structure 
The structure of ghrelin o-acyltransferase has not been fully elucidated or tested experimentally. Using biochemical mapping tools, researchers showed that the ghrelin O-acyltransferase enzyme consists of eleven transmembrane helical domains and one reentrant loop. The C-terminus of ghrelin O-acyltransferase is located on the cytosolic side of the endoplasmic reticulum (ER) while the N-terminus resides in the lumen of the membrane. The topology models of ghrelin O-acyltransferase are similar to those of acetyl-coenzyme A acetyltransferase 1 and glycerol uptake protein 1. This is consistent with ghrelin O-acyltransferase being a member of the membrane bound O-acyl transferase family.

Ghrelin O-acyltransferase contains conserved asparagine (Asn307) and histidine (His338) residues that are found across the membrane bound O-acyl transferase family. These amino acids are positioned on opposite side of the endoplasmic reticulum membrane. His338 resides in the lumen and is necessary for the observed catalytic activity of the enzyme.

History 
The first reported discovery of ghrelin O-acyl transferase was in February 2008 by two separate research groups at Eli Lilly and the University of Texas at Austin (UT). The UT group identified orphan acyltransferase enzymes through the genome database and expressed both the enzymes in ghrelin in cells.[7] They found that membrane bound O-acyltransferase domain 4 specifically acylated ghrelin. The Eli Lilly team confirmed that enzyme is necessary to modify the ghrelin peptide by performing GOAT knock down experiments to prevent expression on the gene. Currently, the major pharmaceutical companies with patents related to ghrelin O-acyl transferase are Eli Lilly, Takeda Pharmaceutical Company, and Boehringer Ingelheim.

Pharmaceutical development 
One medical use of ghrelin O-acyl transferase inhibitors has been in the preclinical treatment of Prader-Willi Syndrome, a rare genetic disorder resulting in early-onset diabetes. In 2018, Rhythm Pharmaceuticals announced a licensing agreement with Takeda Pharmaceutical to develop an orally administered ghrelin O-acyl transferase inhibitor in order to decrease the amount of active ghrelin in individuals suffering from Prader-Willi Syndrome. Preclinical research has shown that this drug prevented weight gain with positive pharmacological and safety profiles.

Additionally, ghrelin O-acyl transferase inhibition has been used in clinical trials in the United Kingdom in studying appetite regulation of post-surgical bariatric patients. The study measured, among other things, the effect of decreased ghrelin levels on gut hormone, adipokine, and cytokine levels.

Chemical Properties 
Structure-activity studies have demonstrated that the ‘GSSF’ N-terminal sequence of ghrelin is essential to ghrelin O-acyl transferase substrate recognition. While the enzyme will accept sequences with a threonine reside in place of serine, catalytic activity is reduced in these cases. Ghrelin O-acyl transferase is also poorly stereospecific and is able to recognize and acylate both stereoisomers of serine. The enzymatic activity of GOAT is also altered when treated with cysteine-modifying substances. Interestingly, the enzyme is relatively insensitive to pH changes in the range of 6-9. Kinetic studies also suggest that GOAT activity is consistent with Michaelis-Menten kinetics in the acylation of ghrelin. One paper proposes that bioavailability of the GOAT substrates represent the rate-limiting step of the acyl transfer reaction and not the chemical process itself.

Biochemical Assays 
Several biochemical assays have been developed to study the activity of the enzyme under in vitro conditions. The most common is the use of an amino acid and radioactive isotope tags to monitor the formation of reaction products. Also widespread is the use of indirect methods to observe ghrelin O-acyl transferase function such as the detection of acylated ghrelin products, which indicate enzyme activity. These assays are based on high-throughput ELISA based techniques. There has also been published literature describing protocols for ghrelin O-acyl transferase function expression and enrichment in insect cells, the use of high performance liquid chromatography assays for acylation activity, and the use of fluorescent protein labels.

Metabolic Function 
In humans, the ghrelin O-acyl transferase function enzyme post-translationally modifies an inactive form of ghrelin, known as proghrelin, on an N terminus serine residue. This function is essential in forming an active form of ghrelin, which can then be secreted into the bloodstream. Ghrelin O-acyltransferase also plays a role in preventing hypoglycemia when there is prolonged negative energy balance in the body. GOAT plays a crucial role in the ability to maintain glucose levels during fasting and starvation. Additionally, the enzyme has a key role in modulating the secretion and sensitivity of insulin. These interactions are used in regulating glucose metabolism in the body.

Regulation 
Ghrelin O-acyltransferase is highly regulated by energy balance and is upregulated when energy is restricted, such as when fasting. Additionally ghrelin O-acyl transferase function is activated by high bioavailability of lipids and fatty foods. The expression of this enzyme is also regulated by several different growth and appetite related hormones. For example, research has shown that the hormone leptin increases ghrelin O-acyl transferase mRNA levels, and therefore enzyme expression.

Inhibition 
Ghrelin O-acyl transferase inhibitors often result in increased insulin secretion, potentially preventing diabetes and obesity. However, the lack of mechanistic information about the active site of the enzyme prevents rational design of inhibitor molecules. Nonetheless, there have been two general classes of ghrelin O-acyl transferase inhibitors which have been described in scientific literature: substrate mimics and small molecules.

In terms of substrate-memetic inhibitors, it has been determined that ghrelin O-acyl transferase is subject to end product inhibition, also known as feedback inhibition. As such, changing the ester linkage between the n-octanoyl group and ghrelin into an amide group decreases the potency of the enzyme. Replacing the acyl chain entirely with a more biologically stable product inhibits the enzyme through competitive binding with the active site of the enzyme. Many similar substrate mimics use chemical modification on the ghrelin molecule to prevent ghrelin O-acyl transferase from carrying out the acylation reaction that activates ghrelin. Other approaches in the category include altering functional group or amino acid stereochemistry to greatly decrease enzyme binding affinity between ghrelin O-acyl transferase and ghrelin.

There have also been recent advances in small molecule, drug-like inhibition of the ghrelin O-acyl transferase enzyme. One study has shown that a class of triterpenoid related molecules has significant inhibitory activity towards the enzyme. These analyses suggest that there is an essential cystine residue in the active site of ghrelin O-acyl transferase that has a role in the enzyme’s catalytic function or inhibitor site binding. This class of inhibitors have been shown to alter ghrelin signaling and reportedly result in weight loss and increased glucose tolerance.

See also 

 Ghrelin
 Acyltransferase
 MBOAT

References

Further reading